Live is a live recording by the Western band Riders in the Sky released in 1984.  It is available as a single CD. It was recorded at the Birchmere in Alexandria, Virginia, on March 5 and 6, 1983.

After four studio albums, Riders in the Sky recorded a live album of the kind of show that keeps their fans coming back for more. Along with versions of their songs, this album is highlighted by some of the Riders' best comedy routines.

Track listing
 "Cowboy Jubilee" (Fred LaBour, Paul Chrisman)
 "The Yodel Blues" (Robert Dolan, Johnny Mercer)
 "When Bloom Is on the Sage" (John Vincent, Fred Wright)
 "After You've Gone" (Henry Creamer, John Layton)
 "Cowboy Song" (Chrisman)
 "Hold That Critter Down" (Bob Nolan)
 "Cielito Lindo" (Traditional)
 "The Last Roundup" (Billy Hill)
 "I Grab My Saddle Horn and Blow" (Nolan)
 "Blue Bonnet Lady" (Chrisman)
 "When Payday Rolls Around" (Nolan)
 "So Long Saddle Pals" (Chrisman)

Personnel
Douglas B. Green (a.k.a. Ranger Doug) – guitar, vocals
Paul Chrisman (a.k.a. Woody Paul) – fiddle, vocals
Fred LaBour (a.k.a. Too Slim) – bass, vocals

External links
Riders in the Sky Official Website

1984 live albums
Riders in the Sky (band) live albums
Rounder Records live albums